The Oregon City class was a class of heavy cruisers of the United States Navy.  Although ten ships of this class were planned, only four were completed – one of those as a command ship. The three ships completed as cruisers were in commission from 1946 to 1980, one having been converted to a guided missile cruiser (CG).

Design and development
The Oregon City-class cruisers were a modified version of the previous  design; the main difference was a more compact pyramidal superstructure with single trunked funnel, intended to improve the arcs of fire of the anti-aircraft (AA) guns.

History
Ten ships were authorized for the class with three being completed and the fourth suspended during construction. The final six ships were cancelled, five after being laid down. Construction on the incomplete fourth ship was resumed in 1948 and the ship served as a command ship . All three completed cruisers were commissioned in 1946. Oregon City was decommissioned after only 22 months of service, one of the shortest active careers of any World War II-era cruiser. A similar conversion was planned for Rochester but was cancelled.

Ships in class

Gallery

See also
 Albany-class cruiser
 List of cruisers of the United States Navy

Notes

References

Bibliography
 Gardiner, Robert and Stephen Chumbley (editors). Conway's All The World's Fighting Ships 1947–1995. Annapolis, Maryland USA: Naval Institute Press, 1995. .
 Whitley, M.J. Cruisers of World War Two: An International Encyclopedia. London: Brockhampton Press, 1999. ,

External links

Global Security.org – Oregon City class cruiser
DANFS

Cruiser classes